Anti-inflammatory is the property of a substance or treatment that reduces inflammation or swelling. Anti-inflammatory drugs, also called anti-inflammatories, make up about half of analgesics. These drugs remedy pain by reducing inflammation as opposed to opioids, which affect the central nervous system to block pain signaling to the brain.

Nonsteroidal anti-inflammatory drugs

Nonsteroidal anti-inflammatory drugs (NSAIDs) alleviate pain by counteracting the cyclooxygenase (COX) enzyme. On its own, COX enzyme synthesizes prostaglandins, creating inflammation. In whole, the NSAIDs prevent the prostaglandins from ever being synthesized, reducing or eliminating the inflammation and resulting pain.

Some common examples of NSAIDs are aspirin, ibuprofen, and naproxen. The newer specific COX-inhibitors are not classified together with the traditional NSAIDs, even though they presumably share the same mode of action.

On the other hand, there are analgesics that are commonly associated with anti-inflammatory drugs but that have no anti-inflammatory effects. An example is paracetamol (known as acetaminophen in the U.S). Contrary to NSAIDs, which reduce pain and inflammation by inhibiting COX enzymes, paracetamol has—as early as 2006—been shown to block the reuptake of endocannabinoids, which only reduces pain, likely explaining why it has minimal effect on inflammation; paracetamol is sometimes combined with an NSAID (in place of an opioid) in clinical practice to enhance the pain relief of the NSAID, while still receiving the injury/disease modulating effect of NSAID-induced inflammation reduction (which is not received from opioid/paracetamol combinations).

Side effects
Long-term use of NSAIDs can cause gastric erosions, which can become stomach ulcers and in extreme cases can cause severe haemorrhage, resulting in death. The risk of death as a result of GI bleeding caused by the use of NSAIDs is 1 in 12,000 for adults aged 16–45. The risk increases almost twentyfold for those over 75. Other dangers of NSAIDs are exacerbating asthma and causing kidney damage. Apart from aspirin, prescription and over-the-counter NSAIDs also increase the risk of heart attack and stroke.

Antileukotrienes

Antileukotrienes are anti-inflammatory agents which function as leukotriene-related enzyme inhibitors (arachidonate 5-lipoxygenase) or leukotriene receptor antagonists (cysteinyl leukotriene receptors), and consequently oppose the function of these inflammatory mediators. Although they are not used for analgesic benefits, they are widely utilized in the treatment of diseases related to inflammation of the lungs (e.g., asthma, COPD), as well as sinus inflammation in allergic rhinitis. They are also being investigated for use in diseases and injuries involving inflammation of the brain (e.g., Parkinson's disease).

Immune selective anti-inflammatory derivatives (ImSAIDs)
ImSAIDs are a class of peptides being developed by IMULAN BioTherapeutics, LLC, which were discovered to have diverse biological properties, including anti-inflammatory properties. ImSAIDs work by altering the activation and migration of inflammatory cells, which are immune cells responsible for amplifying the inflammatory response. The ImSAIDs represent a new category of anti-inflammatory and are unrelated to steroid hormones or nonsteroidal anti-inflammatories.

The ImSAIDs were discovered by scientists evaluating biological properties of the submandibular gland and saliva. Early work in this area demonstrated that the submandibular gland released a host of factors that regulate systemic inflammatory responses and modulate systemic immune and inflammatory reactions. It is now well accepted that the immune, nervous, and endocrine systems communicate and interact to control and modulate inflammation and tissue repair. One of the neuroendocrine pathways, when activated, results in the release of immune-regulating peptides from the submandibular gland upon neuronal stimulation from sympathetic nerves. This pathway or communication is referred to as the cervical sympathetic trunk-submandibular gland (CST-SMG) axis, a regulatory system that plays a role in the systemic control of inflammation.

Early work in identifying factors that played a role in the CST-SMG axis led to the discovery of a seven amino acid peptide, called the submandibular gland peptide-T. SGP-T was demonstrated to have biological activity and thermoregulatory properties related to endotoxin exposure. SGP-T, an isolate of the submandibular gland, demonstrated its immunoregulatory properties and potential role in modulating the cervical sympathetic trunk-submandibular gland (CST-SMG) axis, and subsequently was shown to play an important role in the control of inflammation.

One SGP-T derivative is a three-amino acid sequence shown to be a potent anti-inflammatory molecule with systemic effects. This three-amino acid peptide is phenylalanine-glutamine-glycine (FEG) and its D-isomeric form (feG) have become the foundation for the ImSAID category. Cellular Effects of feG: The cellular effects of the ImSAIDs are characterized in a number of publications. feG and related peptides are known to modulate leukocyte (white blood cells) activity by influencing cell surface receptors to inhibit excessive activation and tissue infiltration.

One lead ImSAID, the tripeptide FEG (Phe-Glu-Gly) and its D-isomer feG are known to alter leukocyte adhesion involving actions on αMβ2 integrin, and inhibit the binding of CD16b (FCyRIII) antibody to human neutrophils. feG has also been shown to decrease circulating neutrophil and eosinophil accumulation, decrease intracellular oxidative activity, and reduce the expression of CD49d after antigen exposure.

Bioactive compounds
Many bioactive compounds showed anti-inflammatory activities on albino rat. In April 2014, plumericin from the Amazonian plant Himatanthus sucuuba has been described as a potent anti-inflammatory agent in vitro and in vivo. Essential oils and extracts from some condiment plants have also been reported with anti-inflammatory activities—due to the presence of bioactive compounds such as eugenol, eucalyptol, menthone, and menthol.

Long-term effects
Anti-inflammatory treatment trials for existing Alzheimer's disease have typically shown little to no effect on halting or reversing the disease. Research and clinical trials continue. Two studies from 2012 and 2013 found that regular use of aspirin for over ten years is associated with an increase in the risk of macular degeneration.

Ice treatment
Applying ice, or even cool water, to a tissue injury has an anti-inflammatory effect, and is often suggested as an injury treatment and pain management technique for athletes. One common approach is rest, ice, compression and elevation. Cool temperatures inhibit local blood circulation, which reduces swelling in the injured tissue and relieves pain.

Health supplements
In addition to medical drugs, some herbs and health supplements may have anti-inflammatory qualities: bromelain from pineapples (Ananas comosus). Cannabichromene, a cannabinoid, also has anti-inflammatory effect. Honokiol from Magnolia inhibits platelet aggregation, and works as an inverse agonist at the CB2 receptor. Black seed (Nigella sativa) has shown anti-inflammatory effect due to its high thymoquinone content. St. John's wort's chief constituent, hyperforin, has been found to be a potent COX-1 and 5-LO inhibitor, with anti-inflammatory effect several fold that of aspirin.

Coal tar has been used for centuries for its anti-inflammatory and analgesic effects. Oral administration for central effects is now rare as coal tar also contains a range of dangerous and carcinogenic compounds, and does not allow for the administration of standardized doses, although some doctors readily utilize coal tar preparations for topical administration (e.g., Denorex, Psoriasin) in the treatment of skin conditions such as eczema and atopic dermatitis. Many modern analgesics and anti-inflammatory agents (such as paracetamol and its predecessor phenacetin) are derived from compounds which were originally discovered during studies to elucidate the chemicals responsible for the tars reputed health benefits.

Dietary patterns
Nutrition is linked to oxidative stress and inflammation. Foods that promote oxidative stress can also promote inflammation, while antioxidative foods may help bringing inflammation levels down. Other pathways may include the link between nutrition and hormones that effect inflammation.

Observational studies show positive effects of low glycemic carbohydrates, whole grains, nuts, seeds, fruits, vegetables, fish and tea. Interventional studies show no effect with whole grains but with tea, vegetables and fruits.

There is concern about saturated fat, which is mainly found in animal products, can promote inflammation.

Epidemiological studies show that a vegetarian or mediterranean diet is associated with lower inflammation levels.

A 2022 meta study found that plant-based diets such as a vegan, vegetarian, or mediterranean diet or the DASH diet are associated with lower inflammation levels and lower oxidative stress. By contrast a Western pattern diet based on white flour, red and processed meat was associated with higher inflammation levels and more oxidative stress.

Dietary patterns contributing to overall inflammation continue to be linked to mental health and are a cause for concern worldwide, especially in countries, like the United States, where inflammatory diets are consumed.

The gut microbiome's (GM) response to diet can have a dramatic anti-inflammatory effect in the body. This is important to note considering a pro-inflammtory state has been linked to poor health outcomes across a lifespan.

Measurement of dietary inflammation
The Dietary Inflammatory Index (DII) is a score (number) that describes the potential of diet to modulate systemic inflammation within the body. The creation of the DII is attributed to scientists led by James R. Hébert at the Statewide South Carolina Cancer Prevention and Control Program at the University of South Carolina. It is based on the review and scoring of 1943 peer-reviewed scientific articles on diet and six inflammatory biomarkers published through 2010. According to Clarivate Web of Science, as of 23 November a total of 480 peer-reviewed scientific articles, including 39 meta-analyses, have been published based on the DII and these have been cited a total of 7545 times.

Exercise
Developing research has demonstrated that many of the benefits of exercise are mediated through the role of skeletal muscle as an endocrine organ. That is, contracting muscles release multiple substances known as myokines which promote the growth of new tissue, tissue repair, and various anti-inflammatory functions, which in turn reduce the risk of developing various inflammatory diseases.

The interplay of exercise on inflammation and the microbiome are being studied with the microbiome being implicated as a major modulator.

Interactions with NSAIDs
Patients on NSAIDs should seek to avoid excessive consumption of omega-6 containing foods. Although many such foods contain the anti-inflammatory omega-3 as well, low doses of omega-6 interfere with omega-3's ability to reduce inflammation, while higher doses are capable of completely inhibiting the effects of most currently-used anti-inflammatory agents (cyclooxygenase 1 inhibitors, cyclooxygenase 2 inhibitors, and antileukotrienes).

The concomitant use of NSAIDs with alcohol and/or tobacco products significantly increases the already elevated risk of peptic ulcers during NSAID therapy.

NSAID painkillers may interfere with and reduce the efficacy of SSRI antidepressants through inhibiting TNFα and IFNγ, both of which are cytokine derivatives.

See also
Corticosteroid

References